Nowe Strącze  (German: Neu Strunz) is a village in the administrative district of Gmina Sława, within Wschowa County, Lubusz Voivodeship, in western Poland.

The village has a population of 115.

References

Villages in Wschowa County